Ian Michael Holmes (born 8 December 1950) is an English former professional footballer, born in Wombwell, Yorkshire, who played as a midfielder in the Football League for Sheffield United, York City and Huddersfield Town. Holmes was a regular member of the York City team that between 1974 and 1976 spent two seasons in the Football League Second Division, the highest status held in the club's history.

References 

1950 births
Living people
People from Wombwell
Footballers from South Yorkshire
English footballers
Association football midfielders
Sheffield United F.C. players
York City F.C. players
Huddersfield Town A.F.C. players
Gainsborough Trinity F.C. players
English Football League players